Ricardo Silva may refer to:

Association footballers 
Ricardinho (footballer, born 1975) (Ricardo Souza Silva), Brazilian footballer
Ricardo Silva (footballer, born 1975), Portuguese footballer
Ricardo Adrian Silva (born 1977), Argentinian footballer
Ricardo Silva (footballer, born 1977), Portuguese footballer
Ricardo Silva (footballer, born 1980), Portuguese footballer
Ricardo (footballer, born 1980), Cape Verdean footballer
Ricardinho (footballer, born September 1984) (Ricardo Ferreira da Silva), Brazilian footballer
Ricardo Jesus (Ricardo Jesus da Silva, born 1985), Brazilian footballer
Ricardo Silva (footballer, born 1992), Brazilian footballer
Ricardo Silva (footballer, born 1999), Portuguese footballer

Others 
Ricardo Silva Elizondo (1954–2021), Mexican singer
Ricardo Silva Romero (born 1975), Colombian writer
Ricardo Enrique Silva, Cuban doctor and dissident
Ricardo Silva (musician) (born 1982), Peruvian musician and artist
Ricardo Silva (American football) (born 1988), American football safety